Marlene Fernanda Cardoso Tavares (born 19 November 2002), known by her stage name Nenny, is a Portuguese singer-songwriter and rapper.

Early life 
She was born in Vialonga, Portugal to Cape verdean parents.

At 9 years old she started writing her own songs.

With 11 years old she went to live in Creil, France and later on Drancy where she lived alone with her mother, which later on she would write a song about. In September 2019 she moved to Luxembourg with her mother searching for better life conditions.

Career 

She started taking her music career more seriously in 2018, after receiving positive feedback for her covers posted on her Instagram account. After a successful cover of "Devia Ir" from Wet Bed Gang, the Portuguese hip-hop group decided to help Nenny grow on the music industry and got her a chance to record her work in a studio. The group are also from Vialonga and saw this as an opportunity to share some local talent. With their help, Nenny releasead two times Platinum single "Sushi".

In 2021 she performed at COLORS, presenting her new songs, "Tequila", in A COLORS SHOW, and "Wave", in A COLORS ENCORE.

On 3 July 2021, she performed in Sumol Summer Fest in Ericeira, Portugal.

Discography

Extended plays (EP's)

Singles

As lead artist

Awards

External links 

 Twitter

References 

Living people
2002 births
Portuguese rappers
21st-century Portuguese women singers
People from Vila Franca de Xira